The Twenty-Seventh Canadian Ministry was the Cabinet chaired by Prime Minister Paul Martin.  It governed Canada from 12 December 2003 to 6 February 2006, including the last five months of the 37th Canadian Parliament and all of the 38th. The government was formed by the Liberal Party of Canada.

List of ministers

By minister

Note: This is in Order of Precedence, which is established by the chronological order of appointment to the Queen's Privy Council for Canada, then in order of election or appointment to parliament for ministers who joined the Privy Council on the same day.

Minister of the Atlantic Canada Opportunities Agency
12 December 2003 – 6 February 2006: Joe McGuire
Minister of Canadian Heritage
12 December 2003 – 19 July 2004: Hélène Scherrer
20 July 2004 – 6 February 2006: Liza Frulla
Minister of Citizenship and Immigration
12 December 2003 – 13 January 2005: Judy Sgro
14 January 2005 – 6 February 2006: Joseph Volpe
Minister of the Economic Development Agency of Canada for the Regions of Quebec
20 July 2004 – 6 February 2006: Jacques Saada
Minister of the Environment
12 December 2003 – 19 July 2004: David Anderson
20 July 2004 – 6 February 2006: Stéphane Dion
Minister of Finance
12 December 2003 – 6 February 2006: Ralph Goodale
Minister of Fisheries and Oceans
12 December 2003 – 6 February 2006: Geoff Regan
Minister of Foreign Affairs
12 December 2003 – 19 July 2004: Bill Graham
20 July 2004 – 6 February 2006: Pierre Pettigrew
Minister of Health
12 December 2003 – 19 July 2004: Pierre Pettigrew
20 July 2004 – 6 February 2006: Ujjal Dosanjh
Minister of Human Resources and Skills Development
12 December 2003 – 13 January 2005: Joseph Volpe
14 January 2005 – 17 May 2005: Lucienne Robillard
18 May 2005 – 6 February 2006: Belinda Stronach
Minister of Indian Affairs and Northern Development
12 December 2003 – 19 July 2004: Andy Mitchell
20 July 2004 – 6 February 2006: Andy Scott
Minister of Industry
12 December 2003 – 19 July 2004: Lucienne Robillard
20 July 2004 – 6 February 2006: David Emerson
Minister of Intergovernmental Affairs
12 December 2003 – 19 July 2004: Pierre Pettigrew
20 July 2004 – 6 February 2006: Lucienne Robillard
Minister of Internal Trade
18 May 2005 – 6 February 2006: Mauril Bélanger
Minister of International Cooperation
12 December 2003 – 6 February 2006: Aileen Carroll
Minister of International Trade
12 December 2003 – 6 February 2006: Jim Peterson
Minister of Justice
12 December 2003 – 6 February 2006: Irwin Cotler
Minister of Labour
12 December 2003 – 19 July 2004: Claudette Bradshaw
Minister of Labour and Housing
20 July 2004 – 6 February 2006: Joe Fontana
Minister of National Defence
12 December 2003 – 19 July 2004: David Pratt
20 July 2004 – 6 February 2006: Bill Graham
Minister of National Revenue
12 December 2003 – 19 July 2004: Stan Keyes
20 July 2004 – 6 February 2006: John McCallum
Minister of Natural Resources
12 December 2003 – 6 February 2006: John Efford
Minister of Public Safety and Emergency Preparedness
12 December 2003 – 6 February 2006: Anne McLellan
Minister of Public Works and Government Services
12 December 2003 – 19 July 2004: Stephen Owen
20 July 2004 – 6 February 2006: Scott Brison
Minister of Social Development
12 December 2003 – 19 July 2004: Liza Frulla
20 July 2004 – 6 February 2006: Ken Dryden
Minister of Transport
12 December 2003 – 19 July 2004: Tony Valeri
20 July 2004 – 6 February 2006: Jean Lapierre
Minister of Veterans Affairs
12 December 2003 – 19 July 2004: John McCallum
20 July 2004 – 6 February 2006: Albina Guarnieri
Minister of Western Economic Diversification
12 December 2003 – 19 July 2004: Rey Pagtakhan
20 July 2004 – 6 February 2006: Stephen Owen
Minister responsible for the Canadian Wheat Board
12 December 2003 – 6 February 2006: Reg Alcock
Minister responsible for Democratic Reform
12 December 2003 – 19 July 2004: Jacques Saada
20 July 2004 – 17 May 2005: Mauril Bélanger
18 May 2005 – 6 February 2006: Belinda Stronach
Minister responsible for the Economic Development Agency of Canada for the Regions of Quebec
12 December 2003 – 19 July 2004: Lucienne Robillard
Minister responsible for La Francophonie
12 December 2003 – 19 July 2004: Denis Coderre
20 July 2004 – 6 February 2006: Jacques Saada
Minister responsible for Homelessness
12 December 2003 – 19 July 2004: Claudette Bradshaw
Minister responsible for the Office of Indian Residential Schools Resolution
12 December 2003 – 19 July 2004: Denis Coderre
Minister responsible for Official Languages
12 December 2003 – 19 July 2004: Pierre Pettigrew
20 July 2004 – 6 February 2006: Mauril Bélanger
Minister responsible for Status of Women
20 July 2004 – 6 February 2006: Liza Frulla
Minister of State (Children and Youth)
12 December 2003 – 19 July 2004: Ethel Blondin-Andrew
Minister of State (Civil Preparedness)
12 December 2003 – 19 July 2004: Albina Guarnieri
Minister of State (Families and Caregivers)
20 July 2004 – 6 February 2006: Tony Ianno
Minister of State (Federal Economic Development Initiative for Northern Ontario)
12 December 2003 – 27 June 2005: Joe Comuzzi
28 June 2005 – 6 February 2006: Andy Mitchell
Minister of State (Financial Institutions)
12 December 2003 – 19 July 2004: Denis Paradis
Minister of State (Human Resources Development)
20 July 2004 – 6 February 2006: Claudette Bradshaw
Minister of State (Infrastructure)
12 December 2003 – 19 July 2004: Andy Scott
Minister of State (Infrastructure and Communities)
20 July 2004 – 6 February 2006: John Godfrey
Minister of State (Multiculturalism)
20 July 2004 – 6 February 2006: Raymond Chan
Minister of State (Multiculturalism and Status of Women)
12 December 2003 – 19 July 2004: Jean Augustine
Minister of State (New and Emerging Markets)
12 December 2003 – 19 July 2004: Gar Knutson
Minister of State (Northern Development)
20 July 2004 – 6 February 2006: Ethel Blondin-Andrew
Minister of State (Public Health)
12 December 2003 – 6 February 2006: Carolyn Bennett
Minister of State (Sport)
12 December 2003 – 19 July 2004: Stan Keyes
20 July 2004 – 6 February 2006: Stephen Owen
Associate Minister of National Defence
12 December 2003 – 19 July 2004: Albina Guarnieri
20 July 2004 – 6 February 2006: Mauril Bélanger
Secretary of State (Science, Research and Development)
12 December 2003 – 3 February 2004: Rey Pagtakhan
President of the Queen's Privy Council for Canada
12 December 2003 – 19 July 2004: Denis Coderre
20 July 2004 – 6 February 2006: Lucienne Robillard
President of the Treasury Board
12 December 2003 – 6 February 2006: Reg Alcock
Attorney General of Canada
12 December 2003 – 6 February 2006: Irwin Cotler
Federal Interlocutor for Métis and Non-Status Indians
12 December 2003 – 19 July 2004: Denis Coderre
20 July 2004 – 6 February 2006: Andy Scott
Leader of the Government in the Senate
12 December 2003 – 6 February 2006: Jacob Austin
Leader of the Government in the House of Commons
12 December 2003 – 19 July 2004: Jacques Saada
20 July 2004 – 6 February 2006: Tony Valeri
Deputy Leader of the Government in the House of Commons
12 December 2003 – 6 February 2006: Mauril Bélanger

References

Succession 

27
Ministries of Elizabeth II
37th Canadian Parliament
38th Canadian Parliament
2003 establishments in Canada
2006 disestablishments in Canada
Cabinets established in 2003
Cabinets disestablished in 2006